Sela is a small village in the Municipality of Sežana, in the Littoral region of Slovenia.

References

External links
Sela on Geopedia

Populated places in the Municipality of Sežana